Chad Premier League (also known as LINAFOOT) is a Chadian league for men's association football clubs. At the top of the Chadian football league system, it is the country's primary football competition. Contested by 12 clubs, it operates on a system of promotion and relegation with Division 2.

Unlike the 1st LINAFOOT edition (in 2015) organised as a full national championship and won by Gazelle FC, the last three editions were organized under the play-off formula.

Since the inception of the Chad Premier League in 1988, eight clubs have won the title: Renaissance (7), Elect-Sport (6), Tourbillon (5), Gazelle (4), Foullah Edifice (3), AS CotonTchad (2), Postel 2000 (2), Renaissance (Abéché) (2). The current champions are Gazelle, who won the title in 2020.

History 

Chadian football has always been followed by the financial difficulties, making it hard to organise the competitions. For years, the main resource was the aid of one million dollars every four years by the FIFA. This aid was completely being engulfed in the organization of national and regional competitions. The national championship was being played in two stages. The first stage was the regional championship with teams from the same prefecture. The second stage was national championship, a sort of tournament between the 14 champions of the 14 prefectures. The format of competition and a number of teams, however, was being changed from time to time. From season 2010 to 2014 the first division consisted of clubs from N'Djamena only. Championship is being played over a short time, usually within a week and held alongside the national cup. The leagues run over a whole year.

Recent history 

The season 2010 was the first one (out of five) to include the teams from N'Djamena only. The league was called Ligue de N'Djamena, too. The participating teams were: ASCOT, DGSSIE, Elect-sport, Foullah, Gazelle, Postel 2000, RFC, Toumai, Tourbillon and USM.
Tourbillon FC were the champions with 38 points, 4 more than league runners-up Gazelle FC.
The last placed team (USM) was relegated to D2, while the 9th team (Postel 2000) played relegation playoff. Postel 2000 played against D2 runner-up, Saccoger, and won 1–0, so both teams remained at previous level.

Season 2011 was the second one to include teams from N'Djamena only. The participating teams were: ASCOT, DGSSIE, Elect-sport, Foullah, Gazelle, Geyser, Postel 2000, RFC, Toumai and Tourbillon.
Foullah Edifice were the champions with 43 points, 8 more than league runners-up Tourbillon.
The last placed team (Geyser) was relegated to D2, while the 9th team (Toumai) played relegation playoff. Toumai stayed in the league, however they did not enter the 2012 season, so the next league edition had 9 teams only.

The participating teams in 2012 were: ASCOT, DGSSIE, Elect-sport, Foullah, Gazelle, GGMIA, Postel 2000, RFC and Tourbillon.
Gazelle were league champions; GGMIA were relegated to D2.

The participating teams in 2013 were: ASCOT, DGSSIE, Elect-sport, Farcha, Foullah, Gazelle, Postel 2000, RFC, Tourbillon and USM.
Foullah were 2013 league champions; USM were relegated to D2.

The participating teams in 2014 were: ASCOT, DGSSIE, Eglise 12, Elect-sport, Farcha, Foullah, Gazelle, Postel 2000, RFC and Tourbillon.
Foullah were 2014 league champions; DGSSIE, Eglise 12, Farcha, Postel 2000 and Tourbillon were relegated to D2.

LINAFOOT

From season 2015, national league system went through many changes. LINAFOOT started operating the league. The new system of 12 clubs from all over the country was introduced as well. Clubs that played in the first division were: AS Lycod Doba, AS Mirim Mongo, AS Wadi Fira, ASCOT Moundou, AS CotonTchad, Elect-Sport FC, FC Kebbi, Foullah Edifice FC, Gazelle FC, Renaissance FC, Renaissance FC (Abéché), AS Kokaga. Gazelle FC won the championship. This edition of LINAFOOT was marked by many controversies, which led to proclaiming AS CotonTchad league champion, and then later giving Gazelle FC champion title back.

In season 2016 championship was interrupted after only 5 rounds, and no Chadian clubs represented the country in continental competitions.

Following financial difficulties and the lack of sponsors, FTFA decided to implement the new format of the national championship, which would lower the costs. In 2017 FIFA proposed to FTFA a new championship format, which FTFA accepted. The new formula of the national football championship takes place in two phases. The first phase is called a zonal phase, and consists of three zones. Zone 1 consists of six clubs from N'Djamena (RFC, Gazelle, Tourbillon, Elect-Sport, Foullah Ediffice and Ascot), Zone 2 consists of the clubs from Sarh, Koumra, Doba, Moundou, Pala and Bongor, Zone 3 includes the clubs of Moussoro, Ati, Biltine, Mongo, Salamat and Abéché. At the end of the zonal confrontations, three clubs in Zone 2 and Zone 3 will join the 4 qualifiers in Zone 1 to start the second phase of the championship. The 5th and 6th of the final ranking will be officially relegated to lower division.

Previous winners 
Champions were:

1988 : Elect-Sport FC (N'Djamena)
1989 : Renaissance FC (N'Djamena)
1990 : Elect-Sport FC (N'Djamena)
1991 : Tourbillon FC (N'Djamena)
1992 : Elect-Sport FC (N'Djamena)
1993 : Postel 2000 FC (N'Djamena)
1994 : Renaissance FC (Abéché)
1995 : Postel 2000 FC (N'Djamena)
1996 : AS CotonTchad (N'Djamena)
1997 : Tourbillon FC (N'Djamena)
1998 : AS CotonTchad (N'Djamena)
1999 : Renaissance FC (Abéché)
2000 : Tourbillon FC (N'Djamena)
2001 : Tourbillon FC (N'Djamena)
2002 : Renaissance FC (N'Djamena) 
2003 : Renaissance FC (N'Djamena)
2004 : Renaissance FC (N'Djamena)
2005 : Renaissance FC (N'Djamena)
2006 : Renaissance FC (N'Djamena)
2007 : Renaissance FC (N'Djamena)
2008 : Elect-Sport FC (N'Djamena)
2009 : Gazelle FC (N'Djamena)
2010 : Tourbillon FC (Ligue de N'Djaména champion)
2011 : Foullah Edifice FC (Ligue de N'Djaména champion)
2012 : Gazelle FC (Ligue de N'Djaména champion)
2013 : Foullah Edifice FC (Ligue de N'Djaména champion)
2014 : Foullah Edifice FC (Ligue de N'Djaména champion) 
2015 : Gazelle FC
2016 : No champion (championship interrupted due financial difficulties)
2017 : abandoned
2018 : Elect-Sport FC (N'Djamena)
2019 : Elect-Sport FC (N'Djamena)
2020 : Gazelle FC
2021: Not played
2022 : Elect-Sport FC (N'Djamena)

Performance By Club

Competition format

Competition 

Since its formation, the league went through many changes in its system and number of participating clubs. In 2015 season (from February to August) each club played the others twice (a double round-robin system), once at their home stadium and once at that of their opponents, for a total of 22 games. In 2016, it was originally planned that 16 clubs participate in the league. The championship was, however, interrupted due financial difficulties. In 2017 FIFA proposed to FTFA a new championship format, which FTFA accepted. The new formula of the national football championship takes place in two phases. The first phase is called a zonal phase, and consists of three zones. Zone 1 consists of six clubs from N'Djamena (RFC, Gazelle, Tourbillon, Elect-Sport, Foullah Ediffice and Ascot), Zone 2 consists of the clubs from Sarh, Koumra, Doba, Moundou, Pala and Bongor, Zone 3 includes the clubs of Moussoro, Ati, Biltine, Mongo, Salamat and Abéché. At the end of the zonal confrontations, three clubs in Zone 2 and Zone 3 will join the 4 qualifiers in Zone 1 to start the second phase of the championship. Teams receive three points for a win and one point for a draw. No points are awarded for a loss. At the end of each season, the club with the most points is crowned champion.

Qualification for African competitions 

The national champion enters the Champions League preliminary round, while cup winner enters Confederation Cup Preliminary round.

CAF Champions League is open to the winners of all CAF-affiliated national leagues. From the 2004 competition the runner-up of the league of the 12 highest-ranked countries also entered the tournament creating a 64-team field. The 12 countries would be ranked on the performance of their clubs in the previous 5 years. As Chad is not among the best 12 countries, it has only one spot in this competition.

From the top twelve placed CAF member associations, the winner of the domestic cup and the third placed club in the domestic league of the considered associations, are eligible to participate in the CAF Confederation Cup, while only domestic cup winners from member associations ranked from 13 till 55 are eligible to participate in the competition. As Chad is not among the 12 best placed countries, it has only one spot in this competition.

Premier League clubs in international competition 

Chadian clubs started to participate in African competitions in 1990, with RFC N'Djamena being the first Chadian club to enter the African Cup of Champions Clubs.
Chadian clubs have never won either Champions League or Confederations Cup. The best result they have achieved was first round of Champions League (RFC N'Djamena in 1990, Elect-Sport in 1991, POSTEL 2000 in 1996, ASCOT N'Djamena in 1997, Tourbillon in 1992, 1998 and 2002, Gazelle in 2010).

Sponsorship 

In July 2014 it was announced that mobile operator Airtel signed a deal with FTFA and became its official sponsor. The goal was improving the football in Chad. Airtel has already signed deals with a lot of African football federations.

Finances 

Le Fonds National de Développement du Sport (FNDS) is the fond for the development of sports in Chad. It finances national football league among the others. For the season 2014, the FNDS marked off 300 million FCFA. Chadian league faced many financial problems during the years. The national league was interrupted a few times because of this. Season 2015 was suspended for financial reasons, but it resumed after 2 and a half months, after some amount of money was paid by Federation.

Clubs 

The following 6 clubs are competing in the Premier League during the 2016 season:

Clubs 2016 

AS CotonTchad (N'Djamena)
Elect-Sport FC (N'Djamena)
Foullah Edifice FC (N'Djamena)
Gazelle FC (N'Djamena)
Renaissance FC (N'Djamena)
Tourbillon FC (N'Djamena)

Stadiums 

Five clubs (ASCOT, Elect, Foullah, Gazelle, RFC) play on the same stadium, Stade Omnisports Idriss Mahamat Ouya, also named Stade Nacional, located in N'Djamena. The stadium holds 20,000 people, and has artificial grass. It is also the home ground of the Chad national football team. It is named after former Chadian highjumper Mahamat Idriss (1942—1987). ASCOT Moundou plays its home games on Stade de Moundou. The stadium holds 10,000 people. RFC Abéché plays its home games on Stade de Abéché (capacity 5,000), while Lycod de Doba plays its home games on Stade Omnisports de Doba (capacity 8,000; built in 2008). Mirim Mongo plays on Stade Idriss Miskine. AS Kokaga Sarh plays on Stade Omnisport de Begou.

Players

Topscorers

References

External links 
League at fifa.com
RSSSF competition history

Football leagues in Chad
Chad